The 2010 Tashkent Open was a tennis tournament played on outdoor hard courts. It was the 12th edition of the Tashkent Open, and is part of the WTA International tournaments of the 2010 WTA Tour. It was held at the Tashkent Tennis Center in Tashkent, Uzbekistan, from September 20 through September 26, 2010.

Entrants

 1 Rankings are based on the rankings of September 13, 2010

Other entrants
The following players received wildcards into the singles main draw:

  Nigina Abduraimova
  Alina Abdurakhimova
  Sabina Sharipova

The following players received entry from the qualifying draw:

  Zarina Diyas 
  Yuliana Fedak
  Eirini Georgatou 
  Nadejda Guskova

The following player received the lucky loser spot:

  Ksenia Palkina

Champions

Singles

 Alla Kudryavtseva defeated  Elena Vesnina 6–4, 6–4.
 It was Kudryavtseva's first title of her career.

Doubles

 Alexandra Panova /  Tatiana Poutchek defeated  Alexandra Dulgheru /  Magdaléna Rybáriková, 6–3, 6–4

External links
Official website

 
Tashkent Open
2010
Tashkent Open